Criminal Justice Commission may refer to 

 Criminal Justice Commission (Queensland)
 Criminal Justice Commission (Sri Lanka)